The 2012–13 season was Al Ain Football Club's 39th in existence and the club's 37th consecutive season in the top-level football league in the UAE.

Club

Technical staff

  Massimo Pedrazzini

Board of directors

Clean sheets
{| class=wikitable 
|-
!Rank
!Player
!Clean sheets 
|-
|align=center|1
|align=left| Dawoud Sulaiman
|rowspan=1 align="center" |8
|-
|align=center|2
|align=left| Mahmoud Almas
|rowspan=1 align="center" |5
|-
|align=center|3
|align=left| Abdulla Sultan
|rowspan=1 align="center" |3
|-
|colspan="2" align="center"|TOTALS
|align=center|16

Hat-tricks

(H) – Home; (A) – Away

Assists
{| class="wikitable" style="font-size: 100%; text-align: center;"
|-
!width=20|
!width=20|
!width=20|
!width=200|Player
!width=50|League
!width=50|League Cup
!width=50|President's Cup
!width=50|Champions League
!width=50|Super Cup
!width=50|Total
|-
|1
|10
|MF
|align="left"| Omar Abdulrahman
|12||||||4||||16
|-
|2
|9
|FW
|align="left"| Kembo Ekoko
|4||||3||||||7
|-
|—
|3
|FW
|align="left"|  Asamoah Gyan
|6||||1||||||7
|-
|4
|6
|MF
|align="left"| Mirel Radoi
|4||1||1||||||6
|-
|5
|16
|FW
|align="left"| Mohamed Abdulrahman
|5||||||||||5
|-
|—
|20
|MF
|align="left"| Helal Saeed
|5||||||||||5
|-
|7
|32
|FW
|align="left"| Alex Brosque
|4||||||||||4
|-
|—
|15
|DF
|align="left"| Khaled Abdulrahman
|2||||||2||||4
|-
|9
|7
|MF
|align="left"| Ali Al-Wehaibi
|1||1||1||||||3
|-
|10
|8
|MF
|align="left"| Mohammed Al Saadi
|||2||||||||2
|-
|—
|33
|DF
|align="left"| Mohammed Al-Dhahri
|2||||||||||2
|-
|12
|23
|DF
|align="left"| Mohamed Ahmed
|1||||||||||1
|-
|—
|19
|DF
|align="left"| Mohanad Salem
|||||1||||||1
|-
|—
|25
|MF
|align="left"| Ahmed Al Shamisi
|1||||||||||1
|-
|—
|65
|FW
|align="left"| Yousef Ahmed
|||1||||||||1
|-
|—
|45
|FW
|align="left"| Mohamed Naser
|||1||||||||1
|-
|—
|36
|GK
|align="left"| Dawoud Sulaiman
|1||||||||||1
|-
|—
|18
|MF
|align="left"| Abdullah Malallah
|||1||||||||1
|-
|—
|27
|MF
|align="left"| Salem Abdullah
|||1||||||||1
|-
|—
|30
|GK
|align="left"| Abdulla Sultan
|1||||||||||1
|-
|—
|34
|MF
|align="left"| Sultan Al Shamsi
|1||||||||||1
|-
|colspan="4"|TOTALS
|49||8||7||6||||70

Goalscorers
{| class="wikitable" style="font-size: 100%; text-align: center;"
|-
!width=20|
!width=20|
!width=20|
!width=200|Player
!width=50|League
!width=50|League Cup
!width=50|President's Cup
!width=50|Champions League
!width=50|Super Cup
!width=50|Total
|-
|1
|3
|FW
|align="left"|  Asamoah Gyan
|31||||||1||||32
|-
|2
|32
|FW
|align="left"| Alex Brosque
|10||3||2||2||||17
|-
|3
|9
|FW
|align="left"| Kembo Ekoko
|8||2||2||1||||13
|-
|4
|10
|MF
|align="left"| Omar Abdulrahman
|7||||||1||||8
|-
|5
|65
|FW
|align="left"| Yousef Ahmed
|2||3||||1||||6
|-
|6
|5
|DF
|align="left"| Ismail Ahmed
|3||||1||||||4
|-
|—
|16
|FW
|align="left"| Mohamed Abdulrahman
|3||1||||||||4
|-
|8
|8
|MF
|align="left"| Mohammed Al Saadi
|||2||1||||||3
|-
|—
|7
|MF
|align="left"| Ali Al-Wehaibi
|2||||1||||||3
|-
|10
|6
|MF
|align="left"| Mirel Radoi
|2||||||||||2
|-
|—
|23
|DF
|align="left"| Mohamed Ahmed
|2|||||||||||2
|-
|12
|21
|DF
|align="left"|  Fawzi Fayez
|1||||||||||1
|-
|—
|25
|MF
|align="left"| Ahmed Al Shamisi
|||1||||||||1
|-
|—
|18
|MF
|align="left"| Abdullah Malallah
|||1||||||||1
|-
|colspan="4"|Own Goals
|||||||||||
|-
|colspan="4"|TOTALS
|71||13||7||6||||97

Awards

References

External links
 Al Ain FC official website 

2012-13
Emirati football clubs 2012–13 seasons